Standing on My Own is the debut international album by Israeli singer Shiri Maimon, released on January 10, 2008. Like Maimon's last albums, this album also combines elements of pop and soul. It contains an English version to her hit single Yoter Tov Lisloach, from her second album.

Track listing 

 "Tender Love"
 "Hard to Forget" (English version of "Yoter T'ov Lisloakh")
 "Crossroads"
 "Eyes for You"
 "Angel" (English version of "Laila")
 "Alone"
 "Joy"
 "Beautiful"

2008 albums
Shiri Maimon albums